Østen is a Scandinavian male given name.

People named Østen include:

 Østen Kjørn (1727–1805), Norwegian woodcarver
 Østen Østensen (1878–1939), Norwegian competitive shooter
 Østen Bergøy, Norwegian singer

See also
 Osten (disambiguation)
 Östen
 Øystein

Scandinavian masculine given names
Norwegian masculine given names